Mariano Sozzini il giovane also Socini (1482–1556) was an Italian jurist after whom the cautela sociniana is named. He was descended from Mariano Sozzini the elder (1397–1467) the first of the family of freethinkers.

Mariano the younger was born in Siena.  He married Agnese Petrucci and had seven sons including Celso Sozzini, Lelio Sozzini, and Alessandro Sozzini, who died young, but was father of Fausto Sozzini, became the figurehead of the Unitarian "Socinian" movement in Poland.

Works

References

Mariano
1482 births
1556 deaths
16th-century Italian jurists